This is a list of notable people from Bihar, India.

Deities and avatars 
 Lordess Sita

 Janaka

 Mahavira

 Guru Gobind Singh

 Vasupujya

 Mallinatha

 Munisuvrata

 Naminatha

Ancient 
 Ajatashatru
 Bindusara
 Brihadratha Maurya
 Chandragupta I
 Dhana Nanda
 Dasharatha Maurya
 Devavarman
 Shalishuka
 Shatadhanvan
 Samprati
 Aryabhata
 Ashoka 
 Chanakya
 Chandragupta Maurya
 Gonu Jha
 Samudragupta
 Sher Shah Suri
 Vātsyāyana

Nationalists and independence activists

 Babu Kunwar Singh
 Rajendra Prasad
Chandradeo Prasad Verma
 Sri Krishna Singh
 Anugrah Narayan Sinha
 Jayaprakash Narayan
 Jagjivan Ram
 Ram Subhag Singh
 Kameshwar Singh 
 Swami Sahajanand Saraswati
 Syed Hasan Imam
 Baikuntha Shukla
 Karyanand Sharma
 Thakur Jugal Kishore Sinha
 Satyendra Narayan Singh
 Ram Dulari Sinha
 Basawon Singh (Sinha)
 Yamuna Karjee
 Yogendra Shukla
 Sheel Bhadra Yagee
 Yadunandan Sharma
 Rambriksh Benipuri
 Ganga Sharan Singh (Sinha)
 Ram Narain Sharma
 Maghfoor Ahmad Ajazi
 Radhanandan Jha
 Seewoosagur Ramgoolam
 Yadunandan Sharma
 Babu Amar Singh

Writers and scholars

Prem Kumar Mani
 Syed Hasan
 Abdul Qavi Desnavi
 Swami Sahajanand Saraswati
 Ram Sharan Sharma
 Bibhutibhushan Mukhopadhyay
 Balmiki Prasad Singh
 Vidyapati
 Manoj Bhawuk
 Ramdhari Singh 'Dinkar'
 Ramvriksh Benipuri
 Devaki Nandan Khatri
 Indradeep Sinha
 Ram Karan Sharma
 Satyapal Chandra
 Mahamahopadhyaya Pandit Ram Avatar Sharma
 Nalin Vilochan Sharma
 Ganganath Jha
 R. K. Sinha
 Ramjee Singh
 Tabish Khair
 Acharya Ramlochan Saran
 Gopal Singh Nepali
 Ramesh Chandra Jha
 Binod Bihari Verma
 Acharya Rameshwar Jha
 Nagarjun
 Acharya Shivpujan Sahay
 Chandeshwar Prasad Narayan Singh
 Amitava Kumar
 Sanjeev K Jha
 Hetukar Jha
 Phanishwar Nath Renu
 Ravindra Prabhat
 Gajendra Thakur
 Kapil Muni Tiwary
 Shiv Khera

Journalists
 M. J. Akbar
 Anuranjan Jha
 Ravish Kumar
 Sweta Singh
 Manoj Bhawuk
 Vikas Kumar Jha
 Arvind Narayan Das

Authors

Hindi
 Bhikhari Thakur
 Ramdhari Singh 'Dinkar'
 Rambriksh Benipuri
 Gopal Singh Nepali
 Phanishwar Nath Renu
 Shankar Dayal Singh
 Ramesh Chandra Jha
 Sahajanand Saraswati
 Kalanath Mishra
 Nawal Kishore Dhawal

Maithili
 Vidyapati
 Nagarjun

Bhojpuri 
Avinash Chandra Vidyarthi
 Bhikhari Thakur
 Dharni Das
Harihar Singh
 Heera Dom
Mahendar Misir
Manoranjan Prasad Sinha
 Manoj Bhawuk
 Pandey Kapil
 Parichay Das
 Ramesh Chandra Jha
Rameshwar Singh Kashyap
 Raghuveer Narayan

Bengali
 Bibhutibhushan Mukhopadhyay
 Upamanyu Chatterjee
 Malay Roy Choudhury

English
 Ram Sharan Sharma
 Raj Kamal Jha
 Satyapal Chandra
 George Orwell

Urdu
 Manazir Ahsan Gilani
 Fuzail Ahmad Nasiri

National and international award winners

Bharat Ratna

 Bidhan Chandra Roy
 Rajendra Prasad
 Jayaprakash Narayan
 Bismillah Khan

Padma Bhushan
 Rashtrakavi Ramdhari Singh 'Dinkar'
 Acharya Shivpujan Sahay
 Bindeshwar Pathak
 Sharda Sinha

Padma Shree
 Ramchandra Manjhi
 Seyed Ehtesham Hasnain
 Mohan Mishra
 Narendra Kumar Pandey
 Janki Ballabh Shastri
 Sharda Sinha
 Chandreshwar Prasad Thakur

Jnanpith award
 Ramdhari Singh 'Dinkar'

Magasaysay award
 Ravish Kumar
 Jayaprakash Narayan

Dada Saheb Phalke award
 Ashok Kumar
 Tapan Sinha

Military Gallantry Award winners

Param Vir Chakra
 Albert Ekka

Ashoka Chakra
 Jyoti Prakash Nirala

Holders of high constitutional offices

Presidents of India
 Rajendra Prasad First President of India

Presidents of other countries
 Sir Anerood Jugnauth former President of Mauritius
 Kailash Purryag former President of Mauritius

Vice-President of other countries
 Parmanand Jha first vice-president of Nepal

Prime ministers of other countries

 Seewoosagur Ramgoolam first Prime Minister of Mauritius
 Sir Anerood Jugnauth current Prime Minister of Mauritius
 Navin Ramgoolam former Prime Minister of Mauritius
 Girija Prasad Koirala former Prime Minister of Nepal
 Basdeo Panday former Prime Minister of Trinidad and Tobago
 Kamla Persad-Bissessar former first female Prime Minister of Trinidad and Tobago

Attorneys general of India
 L.N. Sinha

Advocate General of state of Bihar
Rambalak Mahto, longest serving Advocate General of Bihar and legal advisor of Nitish Kumar.

Governors of Indian states
 Anant Sharma former Governor of Punjab and West Bengal
 Balmiki Prasad Singh current Governor of Sikkim
 Chandeshwar Prasad Narayan Singh former Governor of Punjab
 Dinesh Nandan Sahay former Governor of Chhattisgarh
 Kailashpati Mishra former Governor of Gujarat
 Lallan Prasad Singh former Governor of Assam
 Mridula Sinha current Governor of Goa
 Nikhil Kumar current Governor of Kerala
 Prabhat Kumar former Governor of Jharkhand
 Rameshwar Thakur Former Governor of Madhya Pradesh
 Ram Dulari Sinha former Governor of Kerela
 Siddheshwar Prasad former Governor of Tripura
 Srinivas Kumar Sinha former Governor of Jammu and Kashmir and Assam

Governor of Reserve Bank of India
 Lakshmi Kant Jha

Lieutenant governors of other states
 Tejendra Khanna
 Nagendra Nath Jha

Speakers of Lok Sabha
 Bali Ram Bhagat
 Meira Kumar

Chief justices of India
 Bhuvaneshwar Prasad Sinha
 Lalit Mohan Sharma

Chief ministers

Deputy chief ministers

Members of Lok Sabha

Members of Rajya Sabha (2022)

Spokesperson
 Syed Shahnawaz Hussain (Bharatiya Janata Party)
 Ravi Shankar Prasad (Bharatiya Janata Party)
 Shakeel Ahmad (Indian National Congress)
 Rajiv Pratap Rudy (Bharatiya Janata Party)

Politics

 Rajendra Prasad
 Jayaprakash Narayan
 Anugrah Narayan Sinha
 Sri Krishna Sinha
 Jagjivan Ram
 Ram Subhag Singh
 B.P.Mandal
 Lalit Narayan Mishra
 Thakur Jugal Kishore Sinha
 Ram Dulari Sinha
 Satyendra Narayan Singh
 Karpoori Thakur
 Daroga Prasad Rai
 Deep Narayan Singh
 Abdul Ghafoor
 Chandrashekhar Singh
 Gopal Jee Thakur
 Chirag Paswan
 Faz Husain
 Kailashpati Mishra
 Lalu Prasad Yadav
 Nitish Kumar
 Upendra Kushwaha
 Nikhil Kumar
 Indradeep Sinha
 Digvijay Narain Singh
 Kapildeo Singh
 Bidhu Jha
 Ravi Shankar Prasad
 Gauri Shankar Pandey
 Tarkeshwari Sinha
 Shyam Nandan Prasad Mishra
 Krishna Kumar Mishra
 Srinivas Kumar Sinha
 Yashwant Sinha
 Prabhat Jha
 Sanjay Nirupam
 Mohammad Yunus
 Nawal Kishore Dhawal
 Ranjit Kumar Gupta
 Ram Kripal Sinha
 Veena Devi
 Ramgulam Chaudhary
 Jayant Sinha
Kanhaiya Kumar

Entertainment

Film directors
 Ajit Pal Mangat
 Imtiaz Ali
 Kabeer Kaushik
 Manish Jha
 Manish Vatsalya
 Manjul Sinha
 Neeraj Pandey
 Prakash Jha
 Pritish Nandy
 Ram Gopal Bajaj
 Sanjeev K Jha
 Satyen Bose
 Sushil Rajpal
 Tapan Sinha

Actors
 Aham Sharma
 Manish Vatsalya
 Sushant Singh Rajput
 Roshan Seth
 Ashok Kumar
 Shatrughan Sinha
 Manoj Bajpai
 Manoj Bhawuk
 Akhilendra Mishra
 Abhimanyu Singh
 Adhyayan Suman
 Luv Sinha
 Pankaj Tripathi
 Shekhar Suman
 Sanjay Mishra (actor)
 Vinay Pathak
 Gurmeet Choudhary
 Vineet Kumar
 Narendra jha
 Rajesh Kumar (actor)
 Manoj Tiwari
 Pankaj Jha
 Dinesh Sharma
 R. Madhavan
 Vishal Aditya Singh
 Chandrachur Singh
 Alok Nath
 Khesari Lal Yadav

Actresses
 Aisha Sharma
 Pooja Sharma
 Prachi Sinha
 Neha Sharma
 Sandali Sinha
 Shilpa Shukla
 Neetu Chandra
 Swati Sen
 Kaveri Jha
 Neelima Azeem
 Amardeep Jha
 Suhasini Mulay
 Shilpa Singh
 Shreya Narayan
 Anurita Jha
 Rati Pandey
 Ratan Rajput
 Sriti Jha
 Richa Soni
 Ulka Gupta
 Chhavi Pandey
 Shweta Prasad
 Sonakshi Sinha

Singers
 Daler Mehndi
 Kiran Ahluwalia
 Sundar Popo
 Sharda Sinha
 Manoj Tiwari
 Pawan Singh
 Deepali Kishore
 Aishwarya Nigam
 Parmanand Singh
 Maithili Thakur

Music directors
 Chitragupta
 Anand–Milind
 Bapi Tutul
 Ramashreya Jha
 Norman Hackforth

Arts
 Vidyapati
 Nagarjun
 Ramdhari Singh Dinkar
 Bismillah Khan
 Chandan Tiwari
 Bhikhari Thakur
 Jaydeva
 Jyotirishwar Thakur
 Srimanta Sankardeva
 Govindadas
 Acharya Ramlochan Saran
 Baldev Mishra
 Surendra Jha 'Suman'
 Radha Krishna Choudhary
 Jaykant Mishra
 Rajkamal Chaudhary
 Binod Bihari Verma
 Parichay Das
 Gajendra Thakur
 Bindhyabasini Devi

Religion
 Dharni Das
 Dhyanyogi Madhusudandas
 Dhirendra Brahmachari 
 Prabhat Ranjan Sarkar 
 Sahadeo Tiwari 
 Sa'id Akhtar Rizvi 
 Shams-ul-haq Azeemabadi 
 Syed Ali Akhtar Rizvi 
 Syed Ibrahim 
 Tenzin Priyadarshi
 Fuzail Ahmad Nasiri

Mathematics and science
 Anand Kumar
 H. C. Verma
 Rajit Gadh
 Vashishtha Narayan Singh
 Tathagat Avatar Tulsi

Sports
 Saba Karim
 Kirti Azad
 Subroto Banerjee
 Shivnath Singh
 Thomas Jameson
 Zafar Iqbal
 Rashmi Kumari
 Rajesh Chauhan
 Kavita Roy
 Veer Pratap Singh
 Ishan Kishan
 Deepika Kumari
 Purnima Mahato
 Randhir Singh
 Premlata Agarwal
 Sanjay Balmuchu
 Lal Mohan Hansda
 Aruna Mishra
 Jaipal Singh
 Sharad Kumar
 Pramod Bhagat

Bureaucracy

Indian Civil Service
 L.P. Singh
 Sir Sultan Ahmed

Indian Administrative Service
 Balmiki Prasad Singh
 N. K. Singh
 Pankaj Rag
 R. K. Singh
 U. K. Sinha
 Upamanyu Chatterjee
 Yashwant Sinha

Indian Foreign Service
 Aftab Seth

Indian Police Service
 Abhayanand
 J. K. Sinha
 Nikhil Kumar
 Acharya Kishore Kunal
 Randhir Prasad Verma
 Amitabh Thakur
 Ranjit Sinha
 Anil Sinha

Business
 Anil Agarwal, Founder and Executive Chairman of Vedanta Group
 Arunabh Kumar, CEO of TVF
 Aditya Jha
 Sanjay Jha
 Subrata Roy, Founder of Sahara Group
 Anil Sharma, Amrapali Group
 Samprada Singh
 Satyapal Chandra, Founder & CEO of MagTapp

Others

References

People
Bihar
People from Bihar